The 1979–80 Czechoslovak Extraliga season was the 37th season of the Czechoslovak Extraliga, the top level of ice hockey in Czechoslovakia. 12 teams participated in the league, and Poldi SONP Kladno won the championship.

Standings

1. Liga-Qualification 
 TJ Gottwaldov – Spartak Dubnica nad Váhom 3:1 (2:3, 3:1, 4:2, 7:3)

External links
History of Czechoslovak ice hockey

Czechoslovak Extraliga seasons
Czech
1979–80 in Czechoslovak ice hockey